Vav is a town and the headquarters of Vav Taluka in Banaskantha district in Gujarat state of India. Vav is the largest taluka of the district.

History
The Rana, rulers of Vav, came from Sambhar and Nadol in Rajasthan, and claim kindred with Prithviraj Chauhan, who was defeated and slain by the Afghans in 1193. After many turns of fortune, Dedhrav, driven out of Nandol, settled at Tharad, then under the Chaulukya kings of Anhilwad Patan kings. According to other view his son Rana Ratansing, driven out of Nadol, in 1103, settled at Tharad. Rana Punja, the seventh in descent from Dedhrav was killed by the Muslims in battle in 1283. His son Rana Vaja regained his estate, by influence of his father-in-law the Raval of Jaisalmer, as a grant from Delhi emperor but lost Tharad. So he chose his new capital, Vav. Vav gained its name from a step-well built by his great-grandfather Rana Mehpalji. It suffered very severely from the 1813 famine. During British period, the eighteenth descendant, Umedsinh, agreed with British in 1819-20 and became protectorate.

Vav State was under the Palanpur Agency of Bombay Presidency, which in 1925 became the Banas Kantha Agency and ruled by Koli chieftains. After Independence of India in 1947, Bombay Presidency was reorganized in Bombay State. When Gujarat state was formed in 1960 from Bombay State, it fell under Banaskantha district of Gujarat.

References

Notes

Bibliography
 

 This article incorporates text from a publication now in the public domain: 

Villages in Banaskantha district